"Qurtulush Yolida" ("On the Road to Salvation", also known as "Qurtulush Marshi" ("March of Salvation"), is a Uyghur patriotic song which served as the national anthem of the First East Turkestan Republic and serves as the de facto anthem of the East Turkistan Government in Exile. The song was written by Mehmet Ali Tevfik in 1933.

It is considered an anti-constitutional symbol in China, and its use outside of "educational or artistic contexts" is a criminal offense.

References

External links

Uyghur culture
East Turkestan independence movement